"Feeding Line" is a song recorded by Australian indie rock band Boy & Bear and released in May 2011 as the lead single from their debut studio album Moonfire (2011). The song peaked at number 46 on the ARIA Charts and was certified 2× Platinum in Australian in 2020.

At the ARIA Music Awards of 2011, the song was nominated for two awards, winning ARIA Award for Breakthrough Artist - single. The performed the track at the ceremony.

Reception
Beat Magazine said "'Feeding Line' is a tight, energetic indie rock tune that moves decisively away from seventies folk harmonies towards a more complex, muscular sound." adding "It's a better representation of what makes Boy & Bear such an electrifying live band."

Charts

Certification

References

2011 songs
2011 singles
Boy & Bear songs
ARIA Award-winning songs